Jüttner is a surname. Notable people with the name include:

Hans Jüttner (1894–1965), high-ranking functionary in the SS of Nazi Germany
Jörg Jüttner (born 1941), German sprinter
Josef Jüttner (1775–1848) Austrian army general and cartographer
Robert Jüttner (born 1959), German footballer
Wolfgang Jüttner (born 1948), German politician

See also
Maxwell–Jüttner distribution, is the distribution of speeds of particles in a hypothetical gas of relativistic particles
Christian Juttner (born 1964), American film and television actor